Daniel James Sullivan (April 25, 1867 – November 29, 1901), was a professional baseball pitcher in Major League Baseball from  to . He played for the Columbus Solons and Boston Beaneaters.

Sullivan started his baseball career in 1891. He had short stints in the National League, American Association, and Eastern Association, but did not pitch particularly well in any of them. From 1892 to 1894, he pitched for Providence of the Eastern League, and then he was drafted by the Boston Beaneaters before the 1895 season.

Sullivan pitched well for the Beaneaters teams, including the pennant winners of 1897; however, he was not one of their top pitchers. In 1898, he started off slowly and was released in May.

External links

1867 births
1901 deaths
Major League Baseball pitchers
Boston Beaneaters players
Columbus Solons players
19th-century baseball players
Baseball players from Massachusetts
Rochester Hop Bitters players
Indianapolis Hoosiers (minor league) players
Providence Grays (minor league) players
Providence Clamdiggers (baseball) players
Manchester Manchesters players